Jessie (Janet) Campbell (1827–1907) was a British woman who helped to create the first higher education college for women in Scotland.

Biography

Campbell was born Janet Black on 26 March 1827 in Cross-Arthurlie in Renfrewshire. It is said that the idea of lectures for women in Glasgow arose out of her suggestion at a dinner party. She approached the University of Glasgow to request that lectures were started for women. Natural history, moral philosophy, English literature and astronomy lectures were among the first. They were so successful that the Glasgow Association for the Higher Education of Women was set up with Campbell as its Vice President. In 1883 this became the first college for higher education of women in Scotland: Queen Margaret College (Glasgow).  Campbell was instrumental in securing North Park House as a base for the college, convincing Scottish philanthropist and friend Isabella Elder to purchase it.  She also led the fundraising campaign for the endowment fund. The college became part of the University of Glasgow in 1892.

Campbell is on the University of Glasgow's World Changing website, is pictured alongside Isabella Elder and Janet Galloway in the Janet Galloway Memorial Window in Glasgow University's Bute Hall, and was awarded an honorary degree (LLD) by the University of Glasgow in 1901.

Personal life
Campbell married James Campbell of Tulliechewan in 1846 and had five children. She was the daughter of the owner of a bleaching business.  She died on 10 February 1907.

References

External links
Photograph of Jessie Campbell (University of Glasgow)
Jessie Campbell in her LLD robes (University of Glasgow)

Alumni of the University of Glasgow
1827 births
1907 deaths
Scottish women academics
Scottish women educators
20th-century Scottish educators
19th-century Scottish educators
19th-century women educators
20th-century women educators
20th-century Scottish women